The 2019–20 Eerste Divisie, known as Keuken Kampioen Divisie for sponsorship reasons, was the sixty-fourth season of Eerste Divisie since its establishment in 1955. It began in August 2019 with the first matches of the season and was scheduled to end in May 2020 with the finals of the promotion/relegation play-offs, also involving the 16th-placed team from the 2019–20 Eredivisie. The season was temporarily halted in March 2020, then postponed for several weeks and later abandoned altogether due to the global COVID-19 pandemic and consequent Dutch government decision to disallow all large-scale events until 1 September 2020.

Effects of the 2020 coronavirus pandemic 
On 12 March 2020, all football leagues were suspended until 31 March as the Dutch government forbade events due to the COVID-19 pandemic in the Netherlands. On 15 March this period was extended until 6 April. Due to the decision of the Dutch government to forbid all gatherings and events until 1 June 2020, this period was even further extended.

The Dutch government announced on 21 April that all events subject to authorization, would remain forbidden at least until 1 September 2020. As a result, the KNVB announced the same day, the intention not to continue all remaining suspended competitions. A final decision would be taken after consultation with the UEFA and next the consequences would be discussed with the clubs involved.

On 24 April 2020 the season was cancelled.

Teams 
A total of 20 teams took part in the league. FC Twente gained promotion to the Eredivisie, and was replaced by NAC Breda, who finished bottom in the 2018–19 Eredivisie. Sparta Rotterdam and RKC Waalwijk won the post-season playoff, and were replaced in the 2019–20 Eerste Divisie by Excelsior and De Graafschap.

At an extraordinary KNVB federation meeting on 7 June 2018, representatives of amateur and professional football reached an agreement to renew the football pyramid as of the 2019–20 season. Part of the Agreement was that no promotion/relegation would take place between the Eerste and Tweede Divisie this season.

Personnel and kits

Standings 
As the competition was cancelled, below is the situation on 9 March 2020, the date the last matches were played.

Positions by round 
The table lists the positions of teams after completion of each round.

Period tables

Period 1

Period 2

Period 3

Period 4

Fixtures/results

Results by round

Season statistics

Top scorers

Hat-tricks(+)

Assists

Attendance

References

External links 
  

Eerste Divisie seasons
Netherlands
Eerste Divisie
Eerste Divisie